Cerceau may refer to:
 Aerial hoop, a suspended circular steel apparatus on which circus artists perform aerial acrobatics
 Saint-Pierre Doré, a white French wine grape variety